Arnaud Leclercq  (born March 16, 1967) is a Swiss author, banker, professor of geopolitics at HEC Paris School of Management, and an investor. A limited partner and member of the executive board of Bank Lombard Odier & Co private bank, he is recognized in the finance industry as an expert in private wealth management in the new markets.

Author 

Leclercq published La Russie, puissance d’Eurasie, Histoire géopolitique des origines à Poutine in November 2012 titled (Russian power in Eurasia, a geopolitical history from origins to Putin). This book undergone excellent reviews in French specialized magazines and was later published in Russian language in 2014. The Academy of Russian Foreign Affairs officially selected it as a reference book during a ceremony held in June 2015.

In June 2014, Thomas Flichy de la Neuville, professor at the École spéciale militaire de Saint-Cyr, brought together thirteen experts, including Arnaud Leclercq, to deliver a first analysis on the eminently complex issue of the Ukrainian crisis in his book ‘Ukraine, regards sur la crise’ (Ukraine, view of the crisis).

Leclercq is the author of a number of articles published in notable newspapers and magazines in Switzerland (Le Temps), France (Nouvelle Revue de Géopolitique and Conflits), Russia (RBK Daily) and Middle-East (Arabian Business)  and has been interviewed on television RTS (Switzerland), Russia 24, RT TV  and on radio station Voice of Russia.

Education and career 

Leclercq completed his secondary education at College Stanislas in Paris. After graduation, he opted to complete a degree in law at Paris 2 Panthéon-Assas University. He majored in corporate law & tax and completed a second education in comparative law. In 1989, while completing his studies and onwards, Leclercq worked as a lawyer where he was involved in the burgeoning activity of major acquisitions and East – West European joint ventures. In 1991, after witnessing the lucrative opportunities in Central Europe, Leclercq realized his next focus would be the Russian Federation where early stages of changes were appearing.

After organizing his succession in 1994, Leclercq returned to France to complete his MBA at HEC Paris (alumni). Upon graduation Leclercq joined the construction conglomerate, Bouygues International, where he spent five years. During this period, Leclercq took part in challenging assignments in Poland and in Turkmenistan where he also was an advisor to the Office of the President for international business affairs. Few months prior Russia's default of August 1998, he returned to Moscow, where together with key local partners, he led the development of the first large shopping mall by international standards.

In 2000, Leclercq relocated to Switzerland as he was invited to join Credit Suisse as a private banker where he soon became the global head of Eastern Europe and one of its most senior 20 Managing Directors.

In 2002, Leclercq completed studies in an executive finance program at Stanford University and was  selected by Credit Suisse (2004) to attend Harvard Business School (alumni) within the General Manager Program.

Leclercq joined Lombard Odier on July 1, 2006, and became a limited partner of Lombard. Since then, he became a member of the executive committee of the private bank and the group managing director responsible for the private clients business in new markets.

Leclercq was invited in 2013 to lecture geopolitics at HEC Paris School of Management.

Awards 

In 2007, Leclercq was recognized as "Outstanding Young Private Banker – Europe" at the Private Banker International Awards held that year in Singapore.

Personal life 
In 2012, while dedicating his time to banking activities, Leclercq obtained his PhD summa cum laude from Paris I Sorbonne University. He still occasionally gives lectures or participates as a speaker at international conferences including Ecole des hautes études internationales et politiques (Paris), Russian Economic Forum, the Academy of the Russian Ministry of Foreign Affairs (Moscow), University of Krasnoyarsk, Private Banking World Middle East (Dubai), European banking and financial forum (Prague), Shorex Wealth Management Forum (Moscow, Geneva), Dubai Business Women Council, IDL de Kereden (Locarn Institute), etc.

References 

1967 births
Living people
Harvard Business School alumni
French bankers
French non-fiction writers
Academic staff of HEC Paris